STAR (Study Association Rotterdam School of Management, Erasmus University) is a study association for business administration students of the Rotterdam School of Management, Erasmus University at the Erasmus University Rotterdam based in Rotterdam, Netherlands. STAR was founded in 1977 and currently has 6,500 members, being the largest student-led study association of Europe. STAR has 52 committees and an annual revenue of €0.42 million. The three core values held by STAR are Social, Academic and Career Start Support. 

Well-known events organized by STAR include their anniversary celebration, the STAR Party. This festivity is a student-organized party in the Netherlands and attracts thousands of students, peaking at 4,850 visitors in 2007. Another notable event is their annual Academic Conference, where distinguished academic, business, and political leaders discuss current global issues. 
The STAR Party and the Academic Conference are part of the STAR Management Week. This 2.5 week long event is considered as an interface between students, academia, and their corporate network.

Other events organized by STAR include the Erasmus Recruitment Days and STAR Erasmus Consulting. The Erasmus Recruitment Days, co-organized by STAR and the EFR, is the largest campus recruitment event in the Netherlands. In 2018 there were approximately 1600 participating students and more than 120 companies present. The STAR Erasmus Consultancy Project (SEC) offers companies and non-profit organizations tailor-made contract research in an emerging market country every year.

Mission 
The Study Association STAR aims to provide development opportunities for Rotterdam School of Management (RSM) students, the business school of Erasmus University Rotterdam. These development opportunities are staged on and of the university and together with the faculty, the university and other organisations who take interest in RSM students.

The student population of the RSM consists of international students, divided over the Bachelor of Science in Business Administration, Bachelor of Science International Business Administration and Master of Science in Business Administration education. Study Association STAR provides services for the entire population of RSM.

History 
STAR was established with the namechange, when the association went more international. Formerly STAR was known as Sviib, which was the student association for business administration students founded in 1977. Sviib is the abbreviation of 'Studievereniging Interuniversitaire Interfaculteit Bedrijfskunde' and was established by early business administration students. At the time, business administration was a post-graduate study (equivalent of a second Master's degree), mainly for postgraduates who had already completed a Master of Engineering. The business administration study, or IIB (Interuniversitair Instituut Bedrijfskunde), offered by the Nederlandse Economische Hogeschool (NEH, now Erasmus University Rotterdam) was a joint venture with the Delft University of Technology. In 1984, this was fully incorporated in the Erasmus University Rotterdam as the Faculty of Business Administration for the Doctorandus (an integrated BA and MSc) program in Business Administration) and Rotterdam School of Management for the MBA program. Ten years later, in 2004, these two departments merged into Rotterdam School of Management Erasmus University.

Besides the original Doctorandus degree and Master degrees, the above-mentioned Faculty of Business Administration at the Erasmus University Rotterdam offered two programs for undergraduates: Business Administration (since 1999) and International Business Administration (since 2000)
. The latter had its own dedicated student association, named BActive. BActive was found in 2000. The merger took place in August 2005.

Future 
Considering the origin of the RSM students and the direction in which the RSM is moving, Study Association STAR strives to be a truly international organization. Re-positioning and outlining its services and back office to be both open and attractive to international students as well as national students, will meet this goal. Also, as the RSM networks with other prestigious universities, Study Association STAR will engage in networks with other student and study organisations.

Organization 
STAR is one of the largest student-led organization in Europe and the organization is extensive. STAR organizes over 450 events throughout each academic year. An extensive organizational structure has grown over the past decades.

The organization applies a hierarchical structure in which the STAR Board holds executive power. The STAR Board is responsible for the continuation and daily operations. The STAR Board consists of 9 full-time members, which are newly recruited every year around August on the basis of competence and excellence. Because members of the Board are students of the Erasmus University Rotterdam, they receive a 12-month scholarship for their full-time input. A General Assembly of Members (GAM) is in place on a semi-annual basis, where the STAR Board reports its status on various topics. Reports include the association's financial and strategic position.

Long-term strategy is closely guarded by the STAR Supervisory Board, an entity consisting of prominent senior members of the organization of prior years. Whereas the financial health of the organization is closely monitored and audited by the Verification Committee (VeriCo), consisting of former treasurers of the STAR Board, which is deemed necessary with its €0.42 million revenue per year.

The Committees and Master Study Clubs embody more than 250 students that are dubbed 'Active Members'.

Committees
The following list is an overview of STAR Committees (not exhaustive):

 Academic Committee
 Activity Teams (AT)
 All-MSC Committee
 BA Introduction Days
 BA Study Trip
 Commercial Team
 Consultancy Castle
 Erasmus Recruitment Days
 Erasmus Recruitment Platform
 Eurekaweek
 Euro Trip
 Events Committee
 IBA Freshmen Weekend
 IBA Study Trip
 International Care (iCare)
 International Week
 Marketing Team
 Reach Out
 RSM STAR Case Club
 RSM STAR I WILL Award
 Ski Trip
 Speaker Series
 Sustainability Forum
 STAR Erasmus Consultancy Project
 STAR Management Week

Master Study Clubs
The organization also includes so-called 'Master Study Clubs' (MSC), which are dedicated to specific Master of Science (MSc.) majors offered by the Rotterdam School of Management (RSM). There are a total of 11 Master Study Clubs that cover most of the MSc. majors.

 MSC Accounting and Financial Management
 MSC Business Information Management
 MSC Finance and Investments
 MSC Global Business and Sustainability
 MSC Human Resource Management
 MSC Management of Innovation
 MSC Marketing Management
 MSC Master in Management
 MSC Strategic Entrepreneurship
 MSC Strategic Management
 MSC Supply Chain Management

See also 
 STAR Erasmus Consultancy Project
 Erasmus University Rotterdam
 Management Week
 Rotterdam School of Management
 Rotterdam
 Student society

Notes and references

Student societies in the Netherlands